Homero Nicolás Manzione Prestera, better known as Homero Manzi (November 1, 1907 – May 3, 1951) was an Argentine tango lyricist, author of various famous tangos.

He was born on November 1 of 1907 in Añatuya (province of Santiago del Estero), Argentina. Manzi was interested in literature and tango since he was young. After a brief incursion in journalism, he worked as a literature and Spanish professor but for political reasons (in addition to his membership in the Unión Cívica Radical) he was expelled from his professorship and decided to dedicate himself to the arts.

In 1935 he participated in the beginnings of FORJA (Fuerza de Orientación Radical de la Joven Argentina – Force of Radical Orientation of the Young in Argentina), group whose position has been classified as “peoples nationalism”. It was centered almost exclusively in the problems in Argentina and Latin America. They manifested to “reconquer the political Sunday from our own land” since it was considered that the country was still in a colonial situation. In relation to the European conflict at the time, it supported a neutral position sustaining that there was no great interest was in play in Argentina or Latin America, it was more of a rejection position towards fascism just as much as communism.

In 1934 Manzi founded Micrófono ("Microphone") magazine which covered subjects related to radio telephony, Argentine movies and film making. He wrote the screenplay for Nobleza Gaucha in 1937 in collaboration with Hugo Mac Dougall, and a new version of the silent movie of 1915, Huella ("Footprint") (1940), for which they received second prize from Buenos Aires City Hall. He also worked in Confesión ("Confession") (1940), without achieving commercial success with any of these movies.

In 1940 Manzi started what would be a long collaboration with Ulyses Petit de Murat, writing the screenplay for Con el dedo en el gatillo ("Finger on the trigger") (1940)  Fortín alto ("High Fort") (1940), and The Gaucho War (1942). At the 1943 Argentine Film Critics Association Awards, Manzi and Murat won the  Silver Condor Award for Best Adapted Screenplay for their screenplay of  The Gaucho War which proved highly successful.

The early death of the poet was caused by cancer on Thursday, May 3, 1951.

Tango lyrics by Homero Manzi

Selected filmography
 The Caranchos of Florida (1938)
 His Best Student (1944)
 Savage Pampas (1945)
 Where Words Fail (1946)
 My Poor Beloved Mother (1948)

References

Juan Angel Russo & Santiago D. Marpegan. Letras de Tango. Basilico (1999)

External links
Homero Manzi on tango.info

1907 births
1951 deaths
People from Santiago del Estero Province
Argentine people of Italian descent
Radical Civic Union politicians
Tango poets
Male screenwriters
Argentine film score composers
Male film score composers
Argentine journalists
Male journalists
Argentine film directors
Burials at La Chacarita Cemetery
Silver Condor Award for Best Adapted Screenplay winners
20th-century poets
20th-century composers
20th-century Argentine male writers
20th-century male musicians
Argentine tango lyricists
20th-century Argentine screenwriters
20th-century journalists